Majid Takht-Ravanchi (also Takht-e-Ravanchi, born 15 October 1958, in Tehran) is an Iranian diplomat. He served as the Ambassador of Iran to the United Nations from 2019 to 2022.

Education
Takht-Ravanchi holds a BS and MS from The University of Kansas in Civil Engineering, an MA from Fordham University in International Political Economy and Development, and a PhD from the University of Bern in Political Science.

Negotiations
Takht-Ravanchi is a negotiator who has accompanied Javad Zarif in a series of negotiations with the P5+1 (the United States, the United Kingdom, France, China and Russia plus Germany).

References

|-

|-

|-

1958 births
Living people
People from Tehran
Iranian diplomats
University of Kansas alumni
Fordham University alumni
University of Bern alumni
Ambassadors of Iran to Switzerland and Liechtenstein
Iranian nuclear negotiators
Permanent Representatives of Iran to the United Nations